The Lainingthou Sanamahi Temple Board (LSTB) is a temple development board of the Lainingthou Sanamahi Temple, Haying Khongban Uphong Yumpham, Imphal West district of Kangleipak. It is dedicated not only to God Lainingthou Sanamahi and Goddess Leimarel Sidabi of Sanamahism, but also to the other ancient Meitei gods and goddesses of the traditional Meitei religion.

Permissions 
The Lainingthou Sanamahi Temple Board (LSTB) allowed the public to receive the clothes, brass and copper wares, which were offered to goddess Leimarel Sidabi and god Lainingthou Sanamahi, by making monetary offerings.
The LSTB allowed the public to lit their torches for Yaoshang from the complex of goddess Leimarel Sidabi and god Lainingthou Sanamahi in Haying Khongbal Uphong Yumpham.

Academic activities 
An academic meeting on the topic "Sanamahi Laining Chatlaba Emung Amagi Thouramsingda Chatnagadaba Chatna Pathap" was organised on 22 May 2022 at the office of the Lainingthou Sanamahi Temple Board (LSTB).

Activities in the sacred month 

Starting from the 26th September 2022, which is the first day of the Meitei lunar month of "Mera", the Lainingthou Sanamahi Temple Board began to conduct a series of cultural activities for one whole month because "Mera" is a sacred month of the Meitei religion. Among the different events performed in the month, the following are included:

 The inauguration of the "Sanagi Ningshing Sagai", a photo gallery, which highlights the history of the establishment of the Sanamahi Temple in the holy site of "Heiying Khongban Uphong Yumpham" of Imphal West district.
 The cultural possession of the "Laining Khongchat" in the Kangla Fort. 
 The performance of the "Thou Niba", a cultural dance and music event, and the "Meira Leirik Taba" event. 
 The publishing of a book about Sanamahi religion, written in Meitei script.
 A 15-day academic workshop in collaboration with the Manipur University of Culture aiming to institutionalise the LSTB temple board for the Sanamahi religion.
 The oath taking ceremony of the representatives of the Piba Loisang and the Ningol Loishang of the LSTB.

In the year 2021, the Mera Hou Chongba, which is celebrated on the 15th day of the Meitei lunar month of "Mera", coincided on the 20th of October. It was celebrated by the Lainingthou Sanamahi Temple Board in which the ancient ritual of "Pot Lannaba" was observed.

In the year 2014, the Mera Hou Chongba, which is celebrated on the 15th day of the Meitei lunar month of "Mera", coincided on the 18th of October. It was celebrated by the Lainingthou Sanamahi Temple Board, organising gift exchange ceremony between the tribals (hill people) and the Meiteis (valley people) as per the "Ching-Tam Pot Lanaba" tradition, bringing peace and harmony between the different ethnic groups.

In the year 2013, the Mera Hou Chongba, which is celebrated on the 15th day of the Meitei lunar month of "Mera", coincided on the 19th of October. It was celebrated by the Lainingthou Sanamahi Temple Board in Haying Khongbal, Imphal.

Possessions for goddess Imoinu 
Starting from the 1st of January 2023 (equivalent to the 10th day of the Meitei lunar month of "Wakching"), 50 members of the Lainingthou Sanamahi Temple Board conducted a 3-day possession to spread messages and teachings of goddess Imoinu, specially focusing on the Yumballon, across the Manipur state. Notably, the 3rd of January 2023 corresponds to the 12th day of the "Wakching" month, which is the day of Imoinu Iratpa.
Starting from the Lainingthou Sanamahi Temple at Haying Khongban Uphong Yumpham in Imphal, the possession proceeded to 15 places which are Tangjeng, Chandon Pokpi, Chairel, Khullakpat, Chairel Mangjin Keithel, Napat (Pombikhok), Wangoo Ahallup Makha Leikai, Sandangkhong, Naodakhong, Thamnapokpi, Saiton, Torbung, and Phousakhai, where Imoinu Irat Thouram as well as cultural and traditional programmes were performed by the LSTB possession.

Funding 
The Government of Manipur,  endorsing the Lainingthou Sanamahi Temple Board, is trying to designate a unique annual funding for the temple board, in the aim to bring development and conservation of the Sanamahi religion. The information was announced by the vice president of the temple board, Lourembam Rameshwor, who is also serving as the chairperson of the State Planning and Development Authorities of the Manipur Government, on the closing ceremony of a 15-day workshop on "Rite-De-Passage" of Sanamahism, organized in the shrine of the Lainingthou Sanamahi Sanglen, Haying Khongban, Imphal West.

See also 
 Nikhil Manipuri Mahasabha (NMM)
 International Sanamahism Students' Association (ISSA) 
 Heingang Ching
 Marjing
 Marjing Polo Complex
 Marjing Polo Statue
 Kangla
 Pakhangba Temple, Kangla
 Kangla Nongpok Thong
 Kangla Nongpok Torban
 Nongmaiching Ching
 Nongmaiching Reserved Forest
 Sanamahi Kiyong

Notes

References

External links 
 Lainingthou Sanamahi Temple Board at 
 
 

Cultural organizations
Meitei culture
Non-governmental organizations
Organisations based in Imphal
Religious organizations
Sanamahism